Aeroflot Flight 498 was a Soviet domestic passenger flight from Severomuysk to Ulan-Ude that crashed near Lake Baikal on 14 June 1981 en route to its planned stop at Nizhneangarsk Airport, Nizhneangarsk. All 44 passengers—including 13 children—and 4 crew members on board were killed, and the aircraft was destroyed. It remains the deadliest crash involving an Ilyushin Il-14.

Aircraft
CCCP-41838 was an Ilyushin Il-14M manufactured on 1 January 1957, with 16,185 total air hours and 18,427 cycles. The aircraft was equipped with engines registered as B B 29471633 252073177. At the time of the crash it was being operated by the East Siberia Civil Aviation Directorate of Ulan-Ude under Aeroflot.

Flight description
The crew consisted of pilot Alex T Mordovia, co-pilot Alexander Lobsonovich Kyrmygenov, and engineer Alexander Zharnikov. Aeroflot Flight 498 was originally scheduled to fly from Severomuysk to Baikal International Airport in Ulan-Ude, with a planned en-route stop at Nizhneangarsk Airport in Nizhneangarsk. The aircraft left from Severomuysk at 09:41 MSK.

Due to bad weather, Nizhneangarsk Airport closed, and the crew rerouted the aircraft to land at an airfield in nearby Ust-Barguzin. Foggy conditions and low visibility were likewise reported on Holy Nose Peninsula, what would later become the aircraft's crash site. At 10:30 MSK, almost an hour after takeoff, the crew reported a nearby flight, and at 10:41 began communications with the air tower at Ulan-Barguzin in preparation for landing. Conditions around the Ust-Barguzin airfield were slightly more favorable than had been projected at the aircraft's height. At 11:02 the aircraft called in to report their location, but in violation of air rules, the crew instead called the air control tower at Ulan-Ude and did not report back to Ust-Barguzin. Additionally, they did not report their location or weather conditions. The aircraft's data finder, ARP-6, was found to be unstable, about which the Ust-Barguzin air tower warned Flight 498 well in advance. Shortly before the crash, the flight crew intentionally misinformed the flight deck that the airfield was in sight, and the air tower gave them visual instructions on landing; the crew accepted these instructions at 11:21, without actually being in sight of the air field. The pilot then mistook the Holy Nose Peninsula for the location of the air field.

The flight crashed at a 10-degree angle to the left and an angle of trajectory of 2 or 3 degrees. All 48 people—44 passengers (including 13 children) and 4 crew members—were killed during the crash, and the aircraft was destroyed beyond repair. Much of the equipment was destroyed in the crash, making the exact cause of the accident difficult to pinpoint. Among this equipment was the radio compass ARC-5, making its efficiency impossible to determine. Ultimately, the crash was attributed to passive piloting and crew error.

References

498
Accidents and incidents involving the Ilyushin Il-14
Aviation accidents and incidents involving controlled flight into terrain
Airliner accidents and incidents involving fog
Aviation accidents and incidents in Russia
Aviation accidents and incidents in 1981
June 1981 events in Asia